The 1987 Villanova Wildcats football team was an American football team that represented the Villanova University as an independent during the 1987 NCAA Division I-AA football season. In their third year under head coach Andy Talley, the team compiled a 6–4 record.

Schedule

References

Villanova
Villanova Wildcats football seasons
Villanova Wildcats football